Tamara Alekszejev (born 21 October 1988) is a Hungarian modern pentathlete.

She participated at the 2018 World Modern Pentathlon Championships, winning a medal.

References

External links

Living people
1988 births
Hungarian female modern pentathletes
World Modern Pentathlon Championships medalists
20th-century Hungarian women
21st-century Hungarian women